Jack Lee is an English rugby league footballer who plays for Hunslet in the Betfred League 1.

He has previously played for Castleford and Featherstone Rovers. He played his junior rugby with Smawthorne Panthers.

References

External links
Hunslet profile
York profile

1988 births
Living people
Castleford Tigers players
English rugby league players
Featherstone Rovers players
Hunslet R.L.F.C. players
Keighley Cougars players
Rugby league hookers
York City Knights players